A wind tomb (or seance grave, wind grave; Vietnamese "Mộ gió") is an empty tomb that does not contain a person's corpse. As with wind graves, which are "tumuli" or rounded mounds of earth, wind tombs are typically made by families or loved ones to commemorate a person whose body cannot be found, such as those lost at sea or who have died in combat.

See also
Cenotaph
Veneration of the dead in Vietnam

References 

Tombs in Vietnam